Plévin is a commune in the Côtes-d'Armor department of Brittany in northwestern France.

Population

Inhabitants of Plévin are called plévinois in French.

Geography

Two of the highsest peaks of the Montagnes Noires, the Minez Gligueric and the Minez Zant Yann, stand in the south of the commune. Historically, the village belongs to Cornouaille. Plévin is border by Tréogan and Motreff to the west, by Carhaix-Plouguer and Le Moustoir to the north, by Paule to the east and by Langonnet to the south.

Map

History

Reverend Father Julien Maunoir died in Plévin in January 28, 1693.

See also
Communes of the Côtes-d'Armor department
Julian Maunoir, orthographer of the Breton language and "Apostle of Brittany"

References

External links

Communes of Côtes-d'Armor